The Israeli Basketball Premier League Finals MVP, or Israeli Basketball Super League Finals MVP, is an annual basketball award that is presented to the most valuable player of the finals of the playoffs of the Israeli Basketball Premier League, which is the top-tier level professional basketball league in Israel.

Winners

See also
Israeli Basketball Premier League MVP

References

External links
Israeli Premier League Official website 
Israeli Premier League Official website 

 
European basketball awards
Basketball most valuable player awards